Juan Luciano Inostroza Tapia (27 December 1942 – 2 June 1989) was a Chilean fencer. He competed in the individual épée event at the 1976 Summer Olympics.

References

1942 births
1989 deaths
Chilean male épée fencers
Olympic fencers of Chile
Fencers at the 1976 Summer Olympics